This is a list of lakes and reservoirs of Turkmenistan.

Natural lakes:
 Kattashor Lake (on Amu Darya, in Lebap Province)
 Sarygamysh Lake
Artificial lakes:
 Hanhowuz (Khauz-Khan) Reservoir 
 Hor Hor Reservoir (on Tejen River)
 Iolotan Reservoir (on Morghab River)
 Kolhozbent Reservoir (on Morghab River)
 Kopetdag Reservoir (Ahal Province, west of Ashgabat)
 Kurtli Reservoir (Ahal Province, north-western outskirts of Ashgabat)
 Saryjazin Reservoir (on Morghab River)
 Tashkepri Reservoir (on Morghab River)
 Tejen Reservoir (on Tejen River)

References

 Atlas of the Republics of Soviet Central Asia, Moscow, 1988, pp. 54–65.
 T. V. Dikareva, "Salinization processes and sabkhat formation in the valleys and ancient deltas of the Murgab and Tedgen rivers in Central Asia", Chapter 13 in M. Ajmal Khan et al. (eds.), Sabkha Ecosystems, Volume II: West and Central Asia, Springer, 2006, map of reservoirs on p. 182.

Turkmenistan
Lakes